Where Will You Go may refer to:

"Where Will You Go", a song by Babyface on his 1989 album Tender Lover
"Where Will You Go", a song by KWS on their 1992 album KWS
"Where Will You Go", a song by Evanescence on their 2000 demo album Origin
"Where Will You Go", a song by Ace Young on his 2008 album Ace Young
"Where Will You Go", a song by Kip Winger on his 2008 album From the Moon to the Sun